Starkville–MSU Area Rapid Transit (known as S.M.A.R.T.) operates fixed-route and an ADA paratransit demand response service throughout Mississippi State University and the City of Starkville, Mississippi, United States. As of April 2021, the entire S.M.A.R.T. system is free to use. Children under 16 must be accompanied by an adult to ride on the system.

History
In 2013, the S.M.A.R.T. system was created from an expansion of the Mississippi State transportation system, a system of buses that ran throughout the campus. In 2014, routes for the system were expanded into Starkville itself. In 2015, the S.M.A.R.T. system was awarded as the Transportation System of the Year by the Mississippi Public Transit Association.

Services
S.M.A.R.T. operates Monday through Friday from 7:00a.m. to approximately 8:00p.m. although a few routes only run until 6:00pm. Saturday service is available from 7:00a.m. to 8:00p.m. on four routes, and the other routes not having weekend service. There is no service on Sundays or major holidays at this time.

All routes are interconnected, with many intersecting at the Old Main Academic Center Transit Hub at Mississippi State University. The routes that run throughout the Starkville area run all year. Several routes run only when the university is in session from August through May. The GTR Express route  runs several times a day between the Golden Triangle Regional Airport, located in nearby Columbus, Mississippi, and two stops in Starkville.

Three routes, all running from August to May, run exclusively on the Mississippi State University campus. These routes are:
MSU Central
MSU North
MSU South
Five other routes, all running throughout the year, run either exclusively in Starkville or between the Mississippi State University campus and Starkville. These routes are:
Starkville North
Starkville South
Starkville East
Starkville Central
Starkville Connector

Headquarters
S.M.A.R.T. is operated by MSU Parking and Transit Services. As of April 2021, buses are parked when not in use or when receiving maintenance at the transportation services compound on Buckner Lane.

References

External links
 Official website
 Route Map

Bus transportation in Mississippi